Sebastjan Spahiu (born 30 October 1999) is a professional footballer who plays for KF Laçi.
Born in Belgium, he was a youth international for Albania.

Club career
Spahiu scored his first goal in the Belgian First Division A on 18 May 2018, against OH Leuven. Spahiu left Royal Excel Mouscron on 14 January 2020, where his contract was terminated.

He remained without club until 5 August 2020, where he joined Spanish Segunda División B for CD Guijuelo. After only 14 minutes of playing time at Guijuelo, Spahiu was loaned out to CD Izarra for the rest of the season, on 27 January 2021.

International career
Spahiu was born in Belgium to parents from Shkodër, Albania. On 6 June 2018, Spahiu debuted for the Albania U21s against Belarus U21

References

External links
 Profile - RE Mouscron

1999 births
Living people
Belgian people of Albanian descent
Albanian footballers
Belgian footballers
Association football midfielders
Belgian Pro League players
Royal Excel Mouscron players
Segunda División B players
CD Guijuelo footballers
CD Izarra footballers
Albanian expatriate footballers
Albanian expatriate sportspeople in Spain
Expatriate footballers in Spain
Albania under-21 international footballers
Albania youth international footballers
People from Mouscron
Footballers from Hainaut (province)